The Japanese Festival of Houston, located in Houston, Texas is considered one of the largest Japanese festivals in the United States. Hosted originally by the Japan-America Society of Houston  (JASH, ヒューストン日米協会 Hyūsuton Nichibei Kyōkai) it is now handled by the Japan Festival of Houston Inc under the Japan-America Society of Houston advisement. Typically in the spring of each year, the event can attract nearly 30,000 visitors in a single weekend. While the festival theme changes from year to year, the premise remains the same—to educate the citizens of Houston on the fundamental interests and facts of the land of Japan.

The Japan Festival is located in Hermann Park, typically adjacent to the Japanese Garden near downtown Houston. The festival itself was created by volunteers nearly 20 years ago and is still operated by a volunteer staff.

In 2009, the festival was awarded the title of "Best Festival" by the Houston Press.

This festival went on hiatus in 2020 and did not return in 2021 or 2022. As of January 2023, their website has not been updated.

See also

 History of the Japanese in Houston

References

External links
The Japan-America Society of Houston
Website for the Houston Japanese Festival

1993 establishments in Texas
Asian-American culture in Houston
Asian-American festivals
Cultural festivals in the United States
Festivals in Houston
Hermann Park
Japanese-American culture in Texas
Recurring events established in 1993